Benjamin Michel Édouard André (born 3 August 1990) is a French professional footballer who plays as a central midfielder or defensive midfielder for Ligue 1 club Lille.

Club career

Ajaccio
André was with the Corsica-based club Ajaccio since he was 16 years old, joining the club as an academy player after arriving from his hometown of Nice in Provence-Alpes-Côte d'Azur. After gaining notice playing on the club's under-18 side, he was promoted to the senior squad for the 2008–09 season, despite being only 17 years old at the time of the promotion. André appeared sparingly early on in the season making his debut on 22 August 2008 against Sedan appearing as a substitute in a 1–1 draw. He earned his first start in a Coupe de France match on 22 November 2008 against amateur side Bagnols Pont playing 120 minutes. The match went into a penalty shootout with the young André converting Ajaccio's final shootout goal ensuring the club's advancement to the next round.

Five days later, he made his first league start in a 2–0 defeat to Boulogne. Throughout the season, his starts increased and, despite Ajaccio's inconsistent play, became an instant revelation helping the club reach the Round of 16 of the Coupe de France. He scored his first career goal of the season on the final match day of the season against Châteauroux in a 2–1 loss. His best season with Ajaccio was the 2013–14 Ligue 1 season. Although Ajaccio were relegated, he provided four goals and five assists across all competitions.

Rennes
In the summer transfer market of 2014, André signed with Rennes after six years at Ajaccio. On 25 January 2015, he scored his first goal for Stade Rennais in a 4–1 loss against Caen.

On 27 April 2019, he won the 2018–19 Coupe de France as Rennes beat league champions Paris Saint-Germain in the final, playing the full 120 minutes and lifting the trophy as the team captain.

Lille

On 17 July 2019, André signed a four-year deal with Lille, for a reported €8 million transfer fee. For his first season with Lille, he played his first UEFA Champions League games.

André quickly became an important player for Lille. He showed himself as a consistent performer and their midfield linchpin, as they won their fourth league title during the 2020–21 season, playing 35 league games and emerging as the team vice-captain. Therefore, he was named in the UNFP Team of the Year.

During the 2021–22 Lille OSC season, he participated in the 1–0 win against PSG in the Trophée des Champions, with the club winning that trophy for the first time ever. Later, he helped the team to get out of the 2021–22 UEFA Champions League group stage and played against Chelsea in round of 16.

On 7 August 2022, André started off the new season under new head coach Paulo Fonseca by scoring Lille's first goal in a 4–1 victory over Auxerre on the league opening weekend, 36 seconds after kick-off.

On 12 January 2023, he extended his contract with Lille until 2026.

Personal life
André was born in France to a Senegalese mother and a French father.

Honours
Rennes
Coupe de France: 2018–19

Lille
Ligue 1: 2020–21
Trophée des Champions: 2021

Individual
UNFP Ligue 1 Team of the Year: 2020–21

References

External links

1990 births
Living people
Footballers from Nice
French footballers
Association football midfielders
AC Ajaccio players
Stade Rennais F.C. players
Lille OSC players
Ligue 1 players
Ligue 2 players
France under-21 international footballers
French sportspeople of Senegalese descent